Mannsville is an unincorporated community in Taylor County, Kentucky, United States.  First called "Manns Lick" for a salt lick discovered on the site by its pioneer settler, American Revolutionary War veteran Moses Mann (c1757-1849), the site is at the junction of Kentucky Routes 70 and 337, some 7 miles east of the county seat of Campbellsville.  Its elevation is 738 feet (225 m).  It has a post office with the ZIP code 42758.

References

Unincorporated communities in Taylor County, Kentucky
Unincorporated communities in Kentucky